Now That's What I Call Music! 52 or Now 52 may refer to both Now That's What I Call Music! series albums, including:

Now That's What I Call Music! 52 (UK series)
Now That's What I Call Music! 52 (U.S. series)